Docksta is a locality situated in Kramfors Municipality, Västernorrland County, Sweden with 378 inhabitants in 2010.

References

External links
 website about Docksta 

Populated places in Kramfors Municipality
Ångermanland